Karbalayi Safikhan Karabakhi (c. 1817 - 1910) was an Azerbaijani architect and one of the representatives of Karabakh architecture schools. Buildings by Kerbalai Sefikhan Karabagi included traditional and romantic elements. Designs of Karabagi, such as those for mosques in Aghdam and Barda, employ simple devices based on Azerbaijani architectural traditions.

Works
A characteristic feature of creativity of Karabakhi was rational and skilful use of traditional local architecture. The socket of Yukhari Govhar Agha Mosque built by him in 1883, states in Arabic: "Made by Karbalayi Safikhan Karabakhi. 1301."

The constructed projects by Karabakhi include a mausoleum in Barda (1868), the Agdam Mosque, the Tatar Mosque in Odessa, the Mosque Qarabaghlar in Ashgabat and other civic buildings in Nagorno-Karabakh region.

He is also responsible for creating a single type of mosques with their unique organization of internal space - the division of stone columns on the two-story gallery and the use of domed ceilings in Nagorno-Karabakh region.

References

19th-century Azerbaijani architects
20th-century Azerbaijani architects
Architects from Shusha
1817 births
1910 deaths
Burials at Mirza Hassan Cemetery